Harvey Blashford Charters (born May 8, 1912, in North Bay, Ontario, Canada - died July 17, 1995, in North Bay, Ontario, Canada) was a Canadian flatwater canoeist who competed in the 1930s.

At the 1936 Summer Olympics in Berlin, he won two medals with Frank Saker with a silver in the C-2 10000 m and a bronze in the C-2 1000 m events

References
Sports-reference.com profile

1912 births
1995 deaths
Canadian male canoeists
Canoeists at the 1936 Summer Olympics
Medalists at the 1936 Summer Olympics
Olympic canoeists of Canada
Olympic silver medalists for Canada
Olympic bronze medalists for Canada
Olympic medalists in canoeing
Sportspeople from North Bay, Ontario